Pedra de São Domingos is a rock formation located between the municipalities of Córrego do Bom Jesus and Gonçalves, Minas Gerais, Brazil. The gneiss landform is one of the highest points in the Mantiqueira Mountains.

References

Landforms of Minas Gerais
Rock formations of Brazil